African Diva Reality Show (abbreviated ADRS) is an African series and interactive competition.

The series is a reality, docu-drama that focuses on the search for the ideal African woman. Women from all over the nation will get a chance to compete for the privilege of being called an African Diva. The reality series will be centered on Nigeria's own  superstar Chika Ike.

The show will be internally judged by Chika Ike and a panel of judges that will be both regulars and guest stars. There will be 22 contestants that will begin the show, They will be transported to an undisclosed location.

The show will span over the course of 4 weeks. Each day, the girls will compete in a task. The tasks will judge the girls on their domestic skills, hospitality, entrepreneurship, sports, child-care and their knowledge of Africa. At the end of each task, the contestants will be assessed, there will be winners and losers, and every episode will see the eviction of at least one of the contestants.
The contestants will be winnowed down till only the 3 finalists remain in the house and a winner will emerge.

References

External links
 http://www.bellanaija.com/2014/08/07/think-tyra-banks-antm-meets-big-brother-chika-ike-speaks-on-her-reality-tv-show-african-diva/
http://pulse.ng/movies/african-diva-chika-ikes-look-for-her-reality-tv-show-audition-id3066287.html
http://thenationonlineng.net/new/chika-ike-unveils-new-reality-tv-show-african-diva/

Nigerian reality television series